Frykman is a surname. Notable people with the surname include:

Anna-Lisa Frykman (1889–1960), Swedish composer, song lyricist, and teacher
John Frykman (1932–2017), American Lutheran minister and psychotherapist
Gösta Frykman (1909–1974), Swedish Army officer
Götrik Frykman (1891–1944), Swedish bandy player and footballer
Nils Frykman (1842–1911), Swedish teacher, evangelist, and hymnwriter
Per Frykman (born 1964), Swedish paralympic equestrian